"Just You 'n' Me" is a song written by James Pankow for the group Chicago and recorded for their fifth studio album Chicago VI (1973). The lead vocals are sung by bassist Peter Cetera.

Background
The second single released from that album, it was more successful than the first single, "Feelin' Stronger Every Day", reaching #4 on the U.S. Billboard Hot 100 and #1 on the Cash Box Top 100.  Walter Parazaider plays a soprano saxophone solo during the instrumental section while guitarist Terry Kath uses a wah-wah pedal and phase shifter on his guitar.
"Just You 'n' Me" was written after a fight between Pankow and his future wife Karen:
"We had had a huge fight, it was a nasty lovers' quarrel, if you will. She locked herself in the bathroom and wouldn't come out...'Just You 'n' Me' poured out of me in its entirety. Usually when I write songs I come up with an idea for a chorus or a hook and fill in the blanks in stages. This was a moment of clarity I've never experienced before or after. It remains a special event in my songwriting experience".

Billboard called it one of Chicago's "best singles ever," with a "heartfelt and mature" love lyric.

"Just You 'n' Me" was the final song played by Chicago AM radio station WLS before switching to a talk radio format in 1989.

Personnel
 Peter Cetera — bass, lead vocals
 Robert Lamm —  keyboards, backing vocals
 Terry Kath — guitar, backing vocals
 Danny Seraphine — drums
 James Pankow — trombone
 Lee Loughnane — trumpet
 Walter Parazaider — soprano saxophone

Chart performance

Weekly charts

Year-end charts

References

1973 singles
Chicago (band) songs
Songs written by James Pankow
Song recordings produced by James William Guercio
Columbia Records singles
1973 songs
Cashbox number-one singles